Forget Me Not is a five track promotional album sampler by British pop singer-songwriter Lucie Silvas, released in 2000 (see 2000 in music) in the United Kingdom. Two versions of the sampler were released – one with artwork and one without.

Background
Silvas was signed to EMI Records in 2000 and released her debut single "It's Too Late" on 17 June 2000. It failed to create much interest, charting at only No. 62. Lucie was dropped from EMI before her debut album was released. However, two album samplers of the unreleased album, which was to be titled Forget Me Not, were in circulation. Each sampler contained the same four tracks ("Tonight", "Diggin' a Hole", "Forget Me Not" and the single "It's Too Late"). The fifth track differed between the two samplers. One sampler, with a picture of Lucie as shown in the infobox, contained the track "That's Why I Love You", but the other sampler, which had a blue cover with simply "Lucie Silvas" and "Album Sampler" written on it, had the song "Take Me Back" written on it. The second album sampler with the blue cover is considerably rarer, which explains why all of these songs are on sites such as YouTube, except "Take Me Back".

"Forget Me Not" was re-recorded for Lucie's actual debut album Breathe In, then released as a single in 2005.

Track listing
Version 1 – With album artwork

Version 2 – Without album artwork

B-sides

References

2000 debut EPs
Lucie Silvas albums
Chrysalis Records EPs
Promotional albums